Baz Qaleh-ye Akbar (also Romanized as Bāz Qal‘eh-ye Akbar and Bāz Qal‘eh-e Akbar) is a village in Eslamabad Rural District, Sangar District, Rasht County, Gilan Province, Iran. At the 2006 census, its population was 949, in 261 families.

References 

Populated places in Rasht County